Amina N'Diaye-Leclerc (born 1952) is a Senegalese filmmaker and artist living in France.

Life
Amina N'Diaye-Leclerc is of French-Senegalese origin, the daughter of Senegalese lawyer and politician Valdiodio N'Diaye. Born in Kaolack in 1952, she studied Spanish language and literature in Toulouse. After a while working as a commercial agent for Air Africa, she started working in filmmaking in 1991. She also took up painting in 2000.

Works
 (co-directed with Éric Cloué) Valdiodio N'Diaye, l'indépendance du Sénégal, 2000.

References

External links
 Personal website

1952 births
Living people
Senegalese film directors
Senegalese film producers